Shughni, Shighni (In the local language: хуг̌ну̊н зив, tr. khughnön ziv; Tajik: шуғнонӣ, tr. shughnoni; , tr. shughnoni) may refer to:

 Shughni language, spoken in Afghanistan and Tajikistan
 Shughni people, people residing on both sides of the border of Afghanistan and Tajikistan alongside the Panj River (Oxus)